Furkan Yaman (born 8 January 1996) is a Turkish footballer who plays as a forward for TFF Second League club Arnavutköy Belediyespor. He is a product of the Beşiktaş youth academy.

Yaman has represented the Turkish Football Federation at the U15, U16, U17, U18, and U19 levels.

References

External links
 
 
 

1996 births
People from Gaziosmanpaşa
Living people
Turkish footballers
Turkey youth international footballers
Association football forwards
Beşiktaş J.K. footballers
Menemenspor footballers
Eyüpspor footballers
Kayserispor footballers
Nazilli Belediyespor footballers
Gümüşhanespor footballers
Ankaraspor footballers
Sarıyer S.K. footballers
Süper Lig players
TFF First League players
TFF Second League players